Trochaclis cristata is a species of sea snail, a marine gastropod mollusk in the family Ataphridae, the pyrams and their allies.

References

External links
 To World Register of Marine Species

Ataphridae
Gastropods described in 1995